Katherine Marlowe (born Kathryn Irene Rea; May 25, 1914 – January 2, 2010) was an American film actress in the 1930s, most notably in Dodsworth, which starred Walter Huston, Mary Astor and Ruth Chatterton. Other films included Bridal Grief, Artists and Models and China Passage.

Early years
 
On May 25, 1914, she was born as Kathryn Irene Rea in Corydon, Iowa to Fred Albertson Rea and Lenore Gertrude Wilson. She was raised on a farmstead in Missouri. At age 13, while living in Centerville, Iowa, she won 2nd place for piano performance in a statewide contest. She graduated from high school at the age of 15, earning scholarships to Stephens College, a women's college in Columbia, Missouri, and later to Drake University in Des Moines, Iowa. She worked as an accompanist for other students, and performed in Columbia, Des Moines, and Chicago as a singer/pianist, primarily in hotel ballrooms with various touring big bands. In Des Moines, she and Ronald Reagan modeled together for fashion magazines.

Career
Before making films she worked in Chicago and New York City hotels, musical stage, and radio. She got the lead role in a new musical revue, Two for the Show, in which she introduced a song written to showcase her vocal style, "How High the Moon", which became a pop standard. According to her son, she had worked in Iowa with Ronald Reagan on radio and print advertising. After she left New York and relocated to California, originally invited to be Fred Astaire's dance partner in movies, Reagan moved there and asked to be introduced around, especially to a good agent. Rea obliged. After Reagan was signed for his first film, the contact ended. Rea was signed with Samuel Goldwyn and appeared in films with several studios under different names, such as Kay Marlowe, Katharine Marlowe, Kay Kimber, Kay Rea, Kea Rea, Kay Rhea, Kathryn Marlow, before landing on Kathryn Marlowe. She quipped that it was "because no one can understand how to pronounce 'Rea'". After leaving Hollywood, she had leads in several stage musicals in NYC and London, and roles in Television dramas. She pioneered a daily women's TV program in Ottumwa, Iowa in the early 1950s. Rea was famous for a unique piano style, and for having a three+ octave full-voice range up to high E. 

Marlowe's career was interrupted in 1943 when a dog bit her, causing injuries that she said would mean being unable to work in films for at least six months. She sued the dog's owner for $31,425 in damages.

Marriages
 
Marlowe, whose stage name was Kay Kimber, married the noted band leader Roy Fox in 1943; the couple had two children, Fredrick Rea and Amanda Kathryn. This was Fox's second of three marriages. The family moved to Great Britain, where Fox enjoyed his greatest popularity. Marlowe worked as a pianist and singer, sometimes as a guest with her husband's orchestra. The marriage ended in divorce after Marlowe and the children were sent back to vacation with her parents in Iowa. Unknown to Marlowe, Fox was having a second business failure due to his gambling and a recurring bout of pleurisy resulting in another nervous breakdown.

Her second husband, James O'Keefe, worked for the FBI. O'Keefe adopted her children. In 1956 Marlowe retired from show business altogether.

Death
Marlowe died at the age of 95 in Tampa, Florida after a long period of ill health.

References

1914 births
2010 deaths
Actresses from Iowa
Actresses from Missouri
Actresses from New York (state)
American film actresses
Actresses from Tampa, Florida
People from Corydon, Iowa
People from Centerville, Iowa
20th-century American pianists
American women pianists
20th-century American women singers
20th-century American singers
21st-century American women